The Central Children's Store on Lubyanka is a landmark building and a notable shopping mall located in the historic center of Moscow, in Lubyanka Square. Commissioned in 1957, for several decades it has been the largest children's department store in the Soviet Union, most innovative for its time and a must-visit place for several generations of Muscovites.

Despite the nod towards its name and origin at present the unique shopping center is to a large extent dedicated to baby and children's goods and family entertainment and also has other offers and services. As an architectural site and a modern leisure center Central Children's Store is visited by thousands of residents and tourists from around the world each day.

The grand opening of the mall after renovation took place on March 31, 2015. The main trustees - Mayor of Moscow Sergei Sobyanin and President VTB Bank, second major federal bank in Russian Federation, Andrey Kostin – surrounded by children winded up the mechanism of the monumental clock “Raketa”, mounted in the main atrium of the building, thus representing the start of the new era of the renovated shopping mall. The giant clockwork, weighing over 4,5 tons, was created at the oldest factory in Russian – the “Raketa” watch-making factory at Petrodvorets, and has become one of the attractions in the renovated mall.

The building occupies almost a one hectare (10,000 m2) site and has 200 stores covering 35 000 m2 of retail space. Over 30% of the leaseable area is allocated for youth and a family edutainment and leisure activities, over 20% to dining and services.

History

The building of the main children's department store in the Soviet Union, which was then called “Detsky Mir” (meaning "Children's World"), was designed by a renowned Soviet architect Alexei Dushkin and commissioned in 1957.

The public opening of the store, timed to coincide with the International Festival of Youth and Students, took place June 6, 1957. The Children's World became the largest and the most innovative children's department store in the Soviet Union, a must-visit known to several generations of Russians - here one could find goods for children of all ages: toys, school uniform, photo equipment, creativity products.

In 2005 the building was granted the status of a regional cultural heritage monument. In 2006 the supporting structures and the overall technical condition of the building was declared non-complying with safety requirents. In 2008 the department store was closed for renovation.

Reconstruction

At the end of 2011 the new owner of the building, Hals-Development Public Company, and the chief architect of the reconstruction project Pavel Andreev presented the design and specifications for the reconstruction of the legendary department store.
The construction works began in 2012 and were complete in December 2014.
 
Features of reconstruction:
 The town-planning characteristics of the building (its dimensions), elevations, silhouette, three-dimensional structure, composition, and architectural design of the facades were preserved during the reconstruction as required by law 
 The outside facade walls of the building: ceramic tiles, granite basement and 26 arched windows - subject for protection – were carefully restored and preserved
 The central atrium of the building remained in its historic place, the height raised 30 m
 Eight unique bronze floor lamps once made in the crafts shops of the department store were restored and re-installed on the balcony of the atrium as well as other internal decorations such as over 100 balusters of 1957 in the railings of the atrium
 Еntrance groups to the building from the street and from Lubyanka metro station were restored
 The three-span loggia of the façade facing Lubyanskaya square, lost in the 80s, was restored to its original condition
 COELGO 9 marble was used for internal decoration. This kind of marble has been mined at Coelginskoe deposit since 1924, the same marble was used during the construction of the building in 1957

Reopening
After the building reopened on March 31, 2015, under the name "Central Children's Store on Lubyanka," the historical name still belonged to the owner of the building as the trade network "Children's World."

On March 31, 2015, the original Detsky Mir building reopened under the new name Central Children's Store or Central Children's Store on Lubyanka. With 100 stores in a seven store mall complex, the Central Children's Store opened as the largest complex of children's stores in the world, according to its developer Hals-Development. Hals-Development is a subsidiary of state banking group VTB.

According to the company "Gals-Development", the new architect recreated on the original architectural design of the Central Children's Store (Tzentralne Destski Mir na Lubyanka). Marble for decoration were brought from Koelginskogo deposit (Ural Mountains). Remaining from the original atrium included 8 bronze lamps and marble stairs.

Reportedly the largest clock in the world, the clock in the new atrium was created by the oldest enterprise in Russia, the Petrodvorets watch factory. Six months were necessary for the development and installation of the clock by a group of engineers from the watch factory "Raketa". The clock's mechanism weighs 4.5 tons and consists of 5000 pieces in steel, aluminum, titanium and gold-plated metal. The mechanism has a height of 13 meters and a width of 7 meters. It consists of 21 large gears and a 13 meters pendulum. The pendulum surface acts as aspheric mirror, creating an optical effect. The main mechanism of the clock is on the fifth floor. It is the largest clock mechanism in the world and it is among the five largest mechanical clocks in the world such as Big Ben, the carillon of the Moscow Kremlin, the clock on the "Clock Tower" in Prague or of the clock of the city of Ganzhou.

Architecture and design 

The building of the Central Children's Store with total area of 73 thousand square meters occupies a quarter in a lively tourist location - between Lubyanka Square, Teatralny Drive, Rozhdestvenka Street and Pushechnaya Street. There are public entrances into the building from each side.
One of the exits from the nearest Lubyanka metro station is historic and terminates directly into the shopping mall building.

Prior to the renovation only 4 floors of the building were commercial, the remaining space was used for warehouses, crafts stores and administrative premises. After renovation the total leasable area increased from 19 to 34 thousand square meters hosting over 200 stores with a full range of baby and child products as entertainment, dining and other services.

The elevation of the dome of the central atrium was increased from the level of the 3rd to the 7th floor. At present the building features 24 escalators and 22 elevators and 24 hour underground parking.

The concept of the shopping mall 

Within the edutainment concept the following activities can be found:
 Cyber-sports club Winstrike Arena - a multifunctional cyber-entertainment zone, equipped with advanced computer equipment
 Europe's largest amusement park of virtual and augmented reality Arena Space
 Kidburg family entertainment centre allowing children to role play adult jobs and earn currency
- a model of the adult world for children from 1.5 to 14 years old
 Fantastic entertainment center Zyrkus featuring a 5D dome cinema and playgrounds equipped with immersive technologies, combining the real world and digital content
 Multimedia amusement park "Alice - Return to Wonderland"
 Interactive science museum "Innopark", telling about physics and natural phenomena
 Multiplex cinema Formula Kino (2.5 thousand sq.m located on the 6th floor)
 A stained glass installation was created on the inner dome of the main atrium based on artistinc works of the famous Russian fairy tale illustrator Ivan Bilibin. The area of the stained glass is over 1000 sq.m.

Another stained-glass dome decorates the small atrium in the food court and is designed based on the art work of the one of most known Russian vant-garde artist of Cubist beginning of the 20th century.

 An open observation deck overlooking the historical center of Moscow, Kremlin and the Red Square
 Museum of Childhood featuring 3D-mapping show telling the history of CCS every half an hour
 The main Atrium of the Central Children's Store hosts all kinds of events, concerts, master classes, performances and fairs
 The largest mechanical clock “Raketa” mounted in the main atrium
 3D-mapping show in the main Atrium every hour from 7:00 pm
 Most cafes and restaurants in the Central Children's Store have kids’ play areas with animation on weekends

The mechanical clock “Raketa” 

The largest mechanical clock “Raketa” ordered by Hals-Develment Public Company especially for the renovated shopping mall and designed by the oldest Russian watch-making factory “Raketa” were mounted on the main atrium wall. The technical design and installation of the monumental mechanism took 6 months. The engineers offered over 100 sketches before choosing the final design.

The clockwork weighs over 4.5 tons and consists of 5,000 parts, made of steel, aluminum, titanium and coated with gold.

The operating mechanism of the clock reaches the size of 6 by 7 meters and consists of 21 gears, a 4-meter balance anchors wheel and a 13-meter pendulum with a diameter of 3 meters. The mirror surface of the pendulum acts as an aspherical mirror, creating an optical effect. The main clock mechanism is located on the fifth floor level and can be observed in detail.

The time in the clock of the “Central Children's Store on Lubyanka” regulated by the planetary mechanism and corrected with the help of an innovative electronic device, and the mechanism automatically started by a horizontal pendulum. No other working clockwork mechanism in the world has gears of such significant size.

Museum of Childhood 
The Museum of Childhood opened its doors in 2015 together with the public opening of the shopping mall after reconstruction. The exposition, located on the 7th floor of the legendary building in Lubyanka, features more than 1,500 item: toys and original objects of the era, which were once sold and bought in “the Children's World” department store.

The museum exposition is built on contrasts: modern technologies help to tell about the past. Watching the 3D-mapping show the guests of the Museum of Childhood are transported in time to the department store of the 1950-1980s and learn the history of Soviet toys, which bind more than one generation.

Each visitor can take part in the development of the Museum donating a toy, bought once in the store.

References

External links

Tourist attractions in Moscow
Retail companies of the Soviet Union
Toy retailers
Cultural heritage monuments of regional significance in Moscow